Terry Stephen Puhl (born July 8, 1956) is a Canadian former professional baseball player and coach. Puhl excelled defensively as an outfielder, committing just 18 errors in 1,300 career games. His .993 fielding percentage is the best among outfielders in Astros history and ranks 8th all-time among all outfielders in National League (NL) history.

Puhl is the head coach of University of Houston–Victoria's baseball team and was the manager of the Canada national baseball team. He was inducted into the Saskatchewan Sports Hall of Fame in 1994 and, into the Canadian Baseball Hall of Fame in 1995. He was inducted into the Houston Astros Hall of Fame in 2022.

Early life
Puhl was born and raised in Melville, Saskatchewan. In high school, he played baseball, volleyball, track and football. Pitching on a Midget League team, he led the club to a Canadian championship and was named the nation's outstanding pitcher. Astros scout Harry Morgan signed Puhl to play in the outfield, a role that the pitcher had never played before.

Playing career

Minor league career 
Puhl made his professional debut with the rookie-league Covington Astros the following season, batting .284.

Major league career 
Puhl was called up to the majors in July 1977, and never returned to the minor leagues. He was quickly installed as the club's regular left fielder, replacing Jim Fuller. In his first major league game, on July 12, Puhl entered as a defensive replacement for Fuller. The following day, he got his first hit in the 13th inning of a game against the Los Angeles Dodgers, off reliever Elías Sosa. Later that inning, Puhl scored the winning run on Bob Watson's double. He finished the 1977 season with a .301 batting average in 60 games.

The following year, he was the sole Astro selected as a National League All-Star. He played in 149 games and batted .289 while having 169 hits, 25 doubles, and 32 stolen bases (the most he would ever have in a season). The following year, he would play 157 games (the most he would play in one season) while having his numbers rise and drop slightly, such as batting .287/.352/.377 while having 172 hits, 22 doubles, 49 RBIs, and 30 stolen bases. Puhl played a key part in the Astros making 1980 a banner year. He played in 141 games while batting .282 with 151 hits, 24 doubles, and 27 stolen bases. In the 1980 National League Championship Series against the Philadelphia Phillies, Puhl set a then NL-championship series record with a .526 batting average in a losing cause, the best performance ever by a hitter in a play-off series (it has since been superseded). As of 2019, Puhl has the 19th best lifetime fielding percentage by an outfielder (.993). He committed only 18 errors in 2,660 total chances. In 1981, he was named Canadian Baseball player of the year. That year, he played in 96 games while batting .251 while having 88 hits, 19 doubles, and 22 stolen bases. Puhl recorded his 1,000th hit off Tim Lollar on August 4, 1984, doing so on a single.

A pulled hamstring in 1985 and an ankle injury in 1986 reduced Puhl's playing time. He would play just 57 games in 1985, 81 in 1986, and 90 in 1987 (batting .284, .244, and .230 respectively). He would have one more return to effective hitting in 1988, batting .303/.395/.389 in 113 games, having 71 hits and 22 stolen bases.

Puhl was granted free agent status in 1990, and signed with the New York Mets on December 13, 1990. He was released by the Mets during spring training on April 1, 1991, and signed by the Kansas City Royals on April 25, 1991. Puhl's final MLB game was on May 29, 1991, after which he was released by the Royals on June 9, ending his MLB career. Puhl's career statistics included a .280 batting average, 62 home runs, 676 runs, 435 RBIs, and 217 stolen bases. He accumulated 1,361 hits in 1,531 games. Puhl was particularly effective in postseason play, batting .372 in 13 games over three series. As of 2020, Puhl still ranks in the top ten in numerous categories for the Astros, such as WAR (10th, 28.5), games played (5th, 1,516), and hits (8th, 1,357).

Post-playing career 

After Puhl's retirement in 1991, he was inducted into the Saskatchewan Sports Hall of Fame in 1994 and to the Canadian Baseball Hall of Fame in 1995. In November 2006, Puhl was inducted into the Texas Baseball Hall of Fame.

In August 2006, Puhl coached the Canadian National Senior team at the Olympic qualifier in Cuba. Canada advanced to the next round of qualifiers in 2007. In a 15–12 defeat of Panama, Puhl replaced catcher David Corrente with pinch hitter Reed Eastley in the eighth inning, despite the fact that Corrente had four hits in four at bats. Eastley hit a three-run home run to tie the game. In the bottom of the ninth, Reed Eastley came to bat for a second time, this time with the bases loaded and the game on the line. Puhl instead called on pinch hitter Jeremy Ware, whose grand slam won the game for Canada.

In November 2006, Puhl was announced as the first head baseball coach at the University of Houston–Victoria. The UHV Jaguars were previously an independent team of the NAIA, but beginning in the 2015-16 season will compete as a member of the NAIA's Red River Athletic Conference. He won his 300th career game on January 30, 2021.

Puhl's son, Stephen Puhl, was a minor league baseball player. Selected in the 17th round (514th overall) of the 2006 Major League Baseball draft by the New York Mets, Stephen was a catcher in the Mets system in 2006 and then pitched for the organization in 2007 and 2008.

On January 27, 2022, it was announced that Puhl would be inducted into the Houston Astros Hall of Fame. In March 2022, Puhl announced that he would retire from coaching the Jaguars at the end of the 2022 season. On October 28, 2022 Puhl was selected to throw the ceremonial first pitch at Game One of the 2022 World Series between Houston and Philadelphia.

Head coaching record

See also
List of Major League Baseball players from Canada
UHV Jaguars

References

External links

Terry Puhl at SABR (Baseball BioProject)
Terry Puhl at Pura Pelota (Venezuelan Professional Baseball League)

1956 births
Living people
Baseball people from Saskatchewan
Canada national baseball team managers
Canadian expatriate baseball players in the United States
Canadian people of Norwegian descent
Cardenales de Lara players
Canadian expatriate baseball players in Venezuela
Charleston Charlies players
Columbus Astros players
Covington Astros players
Dubuque Packers players
Houston Astros players
Kansas City Royals players
Major League Baseball outfielders
Major League Baseball players from Canada
Memphis Blues players
National League All-Stars
People from Sugar Land, Texas
Sportspeople from Melville, Saskatchewan
UHV Jaguars baseball coaches
Canadian Baseball Hall of Fame inductees